Men's freestyle 86 kg competition at the 2015 European Games in Baku, Azerbaijan, took place on 18 June at the Heydar Aliyev Arena.

Schedule
All times are Azerbaijan Summer Time (UTC+05:00)

Results 
Legend

Final

Top half

Bottom half

Repechage

References

External links

Wrestling at the 2015 European Games